This is a timeline of artificial intelligence, sometimes alternatively called synthetic intelligence.

Pre-20th Century

20th century

1901–1950

1950s

1960s

1970s

1980s

1990s

21st century

2000s

2010s

2020s

See also
 Timeline of machine translation
 Timeline of machine learning

Notes

References
 
 
 
 
 
 
 
 
 
 
 
 
 
 
 
 
 
 
 
 
 
 .

External links
 
 

Artificial intelligence
 
Contemporary history